The 1986 Camus Malaysian Masters was a professional non-ranking snooker tournament, which took place between 28 and 30 August 1986 at the Putra World Trade Centre in Kuala Lumpur, Malaysia.

10 players competed, consisting of 7 professionals and 3 amateurs. Jimmy White won the tournament, defeating Dennis Taylor 2–1 in the final.


Results

References

Malaysian Masters (snooker)
1986 in snooker
1986 in Malaysian sport